Kuronen is a Finnish surname. Notable people with the surname include:

 Helga Kuronen (born 1939), Finnish long track speed skater
 Mikael Kuronen (born 1992), Finnish ice hockey player
 Olavi Kuronen (1923–1989), Finnish ski jumper

Finnish-language surnames